Nyzhnia Rozhanka is a Carpathian village (selo) in Stryi Raion, Lviv Oblast, of Western Ukraine. It is located within the limits og the Eastern Beskids (Skole Beskids) in the southern part of the Lviv Oblast. Nyzhnia Rozhanka belongs to Slavske settlement hromada, one of the hromadas of Ukraine. Area of the village totals is 18,83 km2 and the population of the village is about 887 people. Local government is administered by Nyzhnorozhanska village council.

Geography 
The village is situated along the Rozhanka river, right tributary of the Opir River (Dniester river basin).
At a distance  are located the ski lifts on the Trostyan mountain.
Mineral springs are located near the villages of Verkhnia Rozhanka and Nyzhnia Rozhanka.

History and attractions 
The village is known from the 13th century, although the official founding date of the village is 1675.

Until 18 July 2020, Nyzhnia Rozhanka belonged to Skole Raion. The raion was abolished in July 2020 as part of the administrative reform of Ukraine, which reduced the number of raions of Lviv Oblast to seven. The area of Skole Raion was merged into Stryi Raion.

The village has a monument of Cultural Heritage in Ukraine, which is the bell tower of the Church of the Epiphany 19th century (wooden) (N – 517).

References

External links 
  village Nyzhnia Rozhanka
 Nyzhnia Rozhanka: Ukraine
 weather.in.ua

Literature 
  Page 717

Villages in Stryi Raion